Dragi Setinov (born 13 February 1961 in Skopje) is a retired Macedonian football player who played for FK Pobeda, Hajduk Split, FK Vardar and Ethnikos Asteras.

Achievements
Macedonian Championship
Pobeda Prilep
1981

External links
 foreign players in Greece at RSSSF.
 Archive of Hajduk Split matches at Hajduk Split official website.
 

1961 births
Living people
Footballers from Skopje
Association football defenders
Macedonian footballers
Yugoslav footballers
FK Pobeda players
FK Vardar players
HNK Hajduk Split players
Ethnikos Piraeus F.C. players
Yugoslav First League players
Super League Greece players
Yugoslav expatriate footballers
Macedonian expatriate footballers
Expatriate footballers in Greece
Yugoslav expatriate sportspeople in Greece
Macedonian expatriate sportspeople in Greece
Macedonian football managers
FK Vardar managers
FK Teteks managers